Farjad Saif (born 24 July 1966) is a Pakistani table tennis player. He competed in the men's singles event at the 1988 Summer Olympics.

References

External links
 

1966 births
Living people
Pakistani male table tennis players
Olympic table tennis players of Pakistan
Table tennis players at the 1988 Summer Olympics
Racket sportspeople from Karachi
Table tennis players at the 2002 Asian Games